Kaanchi Thalaivan is a 1963 Indian Tamil-language historical action film, directed by A. Kasilingam and written by M. Karunanidhi. The film stars M. G. Ramachandran, S. S. Rajendran, P. Bhanumathi and C. R. Vijayakumari, with M. R. Radha and S. A. Ashokan as villains. Produced by Karunanidhi, A. Kasilingam and Murasoli Maran under Mekala Pictures, it was released on  26 October 1963. The film was subject to numerous controversies, and became a financial failure.

Plot 
The story is about the rivalry between the Pallavas and the Chalukyas, MGR as the Narasimha Pallava King, also known as Mamallan, rules Kanchipuram with peace, Pulikesi wants to capture Kanchipuram, with a cunning plan, sending Poovikraman and Chola Kumari to Kanchi. According to the plan, Poovikraman shall work as a sculptor in Kanchi and Chola Kumari as an official. Paranjothi arrests Chola Kumari and takes her to the court of Mamallan, there the King gives due respect and frees her. Meanwhile, Mamallan's friend Manavaraman (King of Ceylon) loses his crown, with his family comes to Kanchi to get the help from his friend, unfortunately the ship wrecks and his family is separated. Poovikraman had the opportunity to save the baby of Manavaraman and later his wife.

Poovikaraman asks Chola Kumari to invite Mamallan, during the feast; she provokes the anger of Mamallan and makes him leave the party without taking the food. Later one of his spies informs him of her true identity.

Poovikaraman sends another girl in place of Manavarman's wife to Paranjothi, on the way she tries to seduce Paranjothi and gives an impression that Manavarman's wife is adulterous. Paranjothi mentions this to Mamallan in front of his friend Manavarman, Paranjothi is slapped by his King, Paranjothi's loyalty stays the same after this incident. Manavarman tries to kill his wife, but Mamallan plays a drama and finds out that the girl Paranjothi took with him is not the wife of Manavarman. Their friendship is renewed.

Though Chola Kumari is against the wish of Pulikesi, her love to Mamallan creates a problem in the kingdom and Pallava's allies turn against him. The time was now ripe for Pulikesi to attack and hold Kanchi forever. Paranjothi too resigns from his post due to the love between the King and Chola Kumari. The King appoints Manavarman as his commander, due to this, his baby was slaughtered by Pulikesi. Initially, Kanchi loses some of its forts to Pulikesi.

Mamallan's sister, who is attached to Paranjothi, asks for his help, but he turns her down. She goes to the temple to pray, where Poovikraman plans to kill Mamallan, before the explosives go off, Mamallan comes out of the temple, but his sister dies. Chola Kumari speaks with Pallava's allies and consents to their wish that she will not marry the Kanchi King. Now Paranjothi volunteers for the war and takes up the commanding position with Mamallan, Manavarman on one side and the allies of Kanchi on another side. They destroy the force of Pulikesi and he was later killed in the battle.

Finally Kanchi's allies changes their wish and ask Chola Kumari to marry Kanchi Thalaivan.

Cast 
 M. G. Ramachandran as King Narasimhavarman I / Mamallan
 S. S. Rajendran as Commander Paranjothi
 P. Bhanumathi as Chola Kumari
 M. R. Radha as Poovikraman / Madhanan
 S. A. Ashokan as Chalukya King Pulakeshin II
 C. R. Vijayakumari as Narasimha's sister Poongkuzhali
 'Valayapathy' Muthukrishnan as Ceylon King Manavarman
 T. A. Madhuram as Bhairavi
 G. Sakunthala as Ceylon Queen Sangai
 D. V. Narayanasamy as Kollidakkarai King Mutharaiyar
 S. V. Ramadas
 Manorama as Singaari
 S. M. Thirupathisamy as Urayur Chola King
 T. V. Sivanandam as Kodumbalur King

Soundtrack 
The music was composed by K. V. Mahadevan. Lyrics were by K. D. Santhanam, M. Karunanidhi and Alangudi Somu.

Controversies 
The censor board objected to the title Kaanchi Thalaivan as politician C. N. Annadurai was, coincidentally, also known as such, and demanded to change the title, but the producers refused. Nonetheless, as noted by historian R. L. Hardgrave, the board "so badly mangled the film that it was a financial failure". The film also courted controversy by portraying the Chalukya king as a buffoon and featured a scene of the Tamil king trampling upon the flag of the Chalukyas. This led to massive protests in Bangalore under the leadership of Kannada activist Ma Ramamurthy culminating into the need for the Kannada flag.

References

External links 
 

1960s historical action films
1960s Tamil-language films
1963 films
Films scored by K. V. Mahadevan
Indian historical action films